This is a listing of the horses that finished in either first, second, or third place and the number of starters in the Precisionist Stakes, an American Thoroughbred horse race run at Santa Anita Park in Arcadia, California. The race is a Grade 3 event for horses three years-old and older and run at 1-1/16 miles in dirt.

From inception through 2013 the race was known as the Mervyn Leroy Handicap when it was hosted by Hollywood Park Racetrack in Inglewood, California.  (List 1980–present)

References

 The Precisionist Stakes at Pedigree Query

Graded stakes races in the United States
Open mile category horse races
Lists of horse racing results
Santa Anita Park
Hollywood Park Racetrack